Yancoal Australia is a coal mining company operating mines in New South Wales, Queensland and Western Australia. A dual-listed company on the Australian Securities Exchange and the Hong Kong Stock Exchange, Yancoal is majority owned by Yankuang Energy Group Company Limited.

History
Yancoal was established in 2004 with the acquisition of the Austar coal mine in the Hunter Valley. In June 2012 it was listed on the Australian Securities Exchange. In September 2017 Coal & Allied was purchased by Yancoal from Rio Tinto. In December 2018 Yancoal became a dual-listed company when it was listed on the Hong Kong Stock Exchange.

Assets

Current

New South Wales
Ashton
Hunter Valley Operations (49%) with Glencore
Moolarben
Mount Thorley Warkworth
Stratford Duralie

Queensland
Cameby Downs
Middlemount (50%) with Peabody
Yarrabee

Western Australia
Premier Coal, purchased from Wesfarmers in September 2011

Former
Austar 
Donaldson

References

Coal companies of Australia
Companies based in Sydney
Companies listed on the Australian Securities Exchange
Companies listed on the Hong Kong Stock Exchange
Dual-listed companies
Non-renewable resource companies established in 2004
2004 establishments in Australia